

Penong is a town and locality on the Nullarbor Plain, in the far west of the state of South Australia located about  north-west of the state capital of Adelaide. With no settlements between it and Border Village on the border with Western Australia, 400 km (250 mi) away on the Eyre Highway, it is a popular rest-stop for travellers.

The 2016 Australian census recorded that the localities of Penong and the small farming community of Bookabie (including the Scotdesco Aboriginal community), 35 km (22 mi) to Penong's west, had a population of 289 people.

Penong is the closest town to the Chadinga Conservation Park. To its south is Cactus Beach, a popular surfing beach on the western side of Point Sinclair; Port Le Hunte – also known as Port Irvine – is on the sheltered eastern side. The Lake MacDonnell gypsum field – the largest in the Southern Hemisphere – is near the coast 15 km (9 mi) to the south. The major port of Cape Thevenard, collocated with Ceduna, is 75 km (45 mi) to the south-east.

History
The name Penong is believed to have derived from an Aboriginal name for a rockhole or corruption of an Aboriginal word, poomong, meaning "tea tree".

The area surrounding Penong was settled by pastoralists in the late 19th century. The town was proclaimed on 28 April 1892, when roads were simply rough tracks. There was access to the (small at the time) port at Cape Thevenard, but the all-important railway to send grain and wool cheaply to Port Lincoln, 426 km (265 mi) to the south-east, did not reach the town until 1924. Rail services were withdrawn in 1997.

Boundaries for the locality of Penong were created on 8 February 2001 and include the government town of Penong.  Additional land including the Chadinga Conservation Park was added on 26 April 2013.

Agriculture
Penong's location on the far west coast of Eyre Peninsula is at the boundary of where rainfall is generally sufficient to support agriculture: the average annual rainfall recorded for nearby Ceduna is only 296.7 mm (11.7 in). Supply of water is therefore crucially important to the community. The town is noted for its privately owned windmills, which supply houses and farms with water from the Anjutabie Basin. The South Australian Railways constructed underground concrete water storage tanks in 1923, with a capacity of 4.54 million litres (1 million gallons), to capture surface water run-off.

Community
The Penong community is active in many activities, such as those of the West Coast Football Club headquartered in Ceduna. Parents of children attending the Penong Primary School raise funds for Relay for Life. In a program to improve public spaces for visiting and local families the Penong Progress Association was successful in 2019 in attracting government funding, through the Outback Communities Authority, to build a shaded shelter and seating for local and visiting families as the third stage of its skate park project. A popular annual event is the Penong Race Club's Far West Farmers Penong Cup horse race meeting in March.

Governance
Penong is located within the federal division of Grey, the state electoral district of Flinders and the Pastoral Unincorporated Area of South Australia. As of 2019, the community within Penong received municipal services from a South Australian government agency, the Outback Communities Authority.

See also
Point Bell Conservation Park

Notes

References

External links
Penong – Nullarbor Travel Guide Australia
Penong – South Australia – Australia – Travel – smh.com.au

Towns in South Australia
Nullarbor Plain
Places in the unincorporated areas of South Australia
Eyre Highway